Lucas Nervi Schmidt (born 31 August 2001) is a Chilean athlete specialising in the discus throw. He has won several medals at regional level.

His personal best in the event is 63.18 metres set in Guayaquil in 2021.

International competitions

References

2001 births
Living people
Chilean male discus throwers
South American Championships in Athletics winners
Ibero-American Championships in Athletics winners
21st-century Chilean people